The 2020 Slovak Cup Final (known as the Slovnaft Cup for sponsorship reasons) was the final match of the 2019–20 Slovak Cup, the 51st season of the top cup competition in Slovak football. The match was played at the Tehelné pole in Bratislava, on 8 July 2020, contested by ŠK Slovan Bratislava and MFK Ružomberok.

Teams
In the following table, finals until 1993 were in the Czechoslovak era, since 1994 were in the Slovak era.

Road to the final
Note: In all results below, the score of the finalist is given first (H: home; A: away).

Match

Details

See also
 2019–20 Slovak Cup
 2020–21 UEFA Europa League

References 

Slovak Cup Finals
2019–20 in Slovak football
ŠK Slovan Bratislava matches
MFK Ružomberok matches